Ben Ammi may refer to:

Ben Ami, a moshav in northern Israel
Ben Ammi Ben-Israel, founder and spiritual leader of the African Hebrew Israelites of Jerusalem

See also
Ben-Ami